Ghelăuza is a commune in Strășeni District, Moldova. It is composed of two villages, Ghelăuza and Saca.

References

Communes of Strășeni District